Taïna Barioz (born 2 June 1988, in Papeete, Tahiti) is a French alpine skier.

She is the daughter of French ice hockey player Didier Barioz.

Barioz won two podiums in Alpine Skiing World Cup, both in giant slalom: 3rd place in Lienz, Austria (December 2009), and then 2nd place at the World Cup finals in St. Moritz, Switzerland (March 2016).

Barioz placed 1st in the 2014 FIS NorAms.

She also competed at the 2018 Winter Olympics in PyeongChang, South Korea where she finished in 19th place, as second best of the French skiers in the Giant Slalom competition.

References

French female alpine skiers
Living people
1988 births
Alpine skiers at the 2010 Winter Olympics
Alpine skiers at the 2018 Winter Olympics
Olympic alpine skiers of France
People from Papeete